Téglás is a town in Hajdú-Bihar county, in the Northern Great Plain region of eastern Hungary.

Geography
Téglás also is accessible to Debrecen to the south and Nyíregyháza to the north. As well as those two locations, you could head west towards Balkány.

Sports 
Téglás has a soccer team called Téglas VSE.

International relations

Twin towns – Sister cities
Téglás is twinned with:

  Affalterbach, Germany  
  Fulnek, Czech Republic
  Ludwin, Poland

References

External links

  in Hungarian

Populated places in Hajdú-Bihar County